Marine All-Weather Fighter Squadron 114 (VMF(AW)-114) was a squadron of the United States Marine Corps that was originally commissioned during World War II. Nicknamed the “Death Dealers”, the squadron saw the most action during the war providing close air support during the Battle of Peleliu. The squadron remained on active duty until being decommissioned in 1963.

History

World War II

Marine Fighting Squadron 114 was commissioned on July 11, 1943 at Marine Corps Air Station El Toro.  The squadron remained on the West Coast of the United States until August 1943 when it then transferred to Marine Corps Air Station Ewa, Hawaii.  In Hawaii, squadron pilots continued their training until moving to Midway Island on December 18, 1943.  VMF-114 returned to Ewa in February 1944 and in March they moved first to Espiritu Santo and the Green Island.  While there, they flew strike missions against Japanese garrisons that had been bypassed in the Bismarck Islands.

The first major combat that VMF-114 took part in was the Battle of Peleliu.  The squadron arrived on Peleliu on September 17, 1944 and provided most of the close air support (CAS) for Marine Corps forces during the course of the battle.  They also provided the preparatory bombing and CAS for the 3rd Battalion, 5th Marines when they assaulted Ngesebus during the battle.  The terrain on the island, earlier judged unsuitable for anything but the costliest and most difficult advances, was made passable with the aid of preparatory fire-scouring by napalm bombs from 114.  MajGen William H. Rupertus, the Commanding General of the 1st Marine Division on Peleliu would say following the battle that the air support provided during the campaign was, "executed in a manner leaving little to be desired.  Following the battle, they remained based on the island again assuming the role of attacking bypassed Japanese garrisons in the vicinity of the western Caroline Islands.  The squadron remained in the area until they ceased combat operations on June 1, 1945.

Post-war years
Following the war, VMF-114 escaped the post-war drawdown of forces and were transferred to Marine Corps Air Station Cherry Point in February 1946. In August 1947, the squadron was redesignated Marine Night Fighter Squadron 114 (VMF(N)-114) after they were reequipped with the nightfighter version of the F4U Corsair. Within a few years, the squadron transitioned to the F2H Banshee and on June 1, 1953 they were again redesignated VMF-114. They returned from this deployment on July 3, 1953.

The squadron transitioned to the F9F-8 Cougar, in 1955, and then to the F4D Skyray, on May 1, 1957. The squadron was redesignated a Fixed-Wing Marine All Weather Fighter Squadron, (VMF(AW)-114) at that time. The squadron lost two pilots on this tour. Major Robert W. Minick was killed in a landing accident aboard the carrier, on January 15, 1959.  1Lt. William Denima died on July 24, 1959, when he inadvertently shut off his engine and impacted the ocean surface while attempting an airstart. Upon their return they went back to the normal deployment rotation, including a stint at Naval Air Station Roosevelt Roads. In January 1961, the squadron was transferred to Naval Air Facility Atsugi, Japan where they served until the squadron was deactivated on July 1, 1963;

Awards
  Navy Unit Commendation    September 15, 1944 – January 31, 1945

See also

 United States Marine Corps Aviation
 List of active United States Marine Corps aircraft squadrons
 List of inactive United States Marine Corps aircraft squadrons

Notes

References
Bibliography

 

 

Web

Fighting114
Inactive units of the United States Marine Corps